Whitehorse Centre is an electoral district which returns a member (known as an MLA) to the Legislative Assembly of the Yukon in Canada. It was created in 1992 from an amalgamation of the ridings of Whitehorse North Centre and Whitehorse South Centre and readjusted in 2002 following the dissolution of the neighbouring riding of Riverside. The riding encompasses the downtown core of the City of Whitehorse (including Marwell) between the escarpment and the Yukon River. Whitehorse Centre is home to most of Whitehorse's businesses and government offices.

Whitehorse Centre is bordered by the ridings of Riverdale North, Takhini-Kopper King, and Mountainview.

The riding is generally considered a New Democrat stronghold.

Members of the Legislative Assembly

Electoral results

2021 general election

2016 general election

|-

| NDP
| Liz Hanson
| align="right"| 487
| align="right"| 43.8%
| align="right"| -18.3%

| Liberal
| Tamara Goeppel
| align="right"| 432
| align="right"| 38.9%
| align="right"| +23.6%
|-

|-
! align=left colspan=3|Total
! align=right| 1,112
! align=right| 100.0%
! align=right| –
|}

2011 general election

|-

| NDP
| Liz Hanson
| align="right"| 525
| align="right"| 62.1%
| align="right"| +9.6%
|-

|-

| Liberal
| Patrick Singh
| align="right"| 104
| align="right"| 12.3%
| align="right"| -13.9%
|-
! align=left colspan=3|Total
! align=right| 846
! align=right| 100.0%
! align=right| –
|}

2010 by-election

 
|NDP
|Liz Hanson
|align="right"| 356
|align="right"| 51.6%
|align="right"| +5.0%
|-
 
|Liberal
|Kirk Cameron
|align="right"| 181
|align="right"| 26.2%
|align="right"| -1.3%
|-

|-
! align=left colspan=3|Total
! align=right| 690
! align=right| 100.0%
! align=right| –
|}
Held upon the death of Todd Hardy, July 28, 2010.

2006 general election

|-
 
|NDP
|Todd Hardy
|align="right"| 357
|align="right"| 46.6%
|align="right"| +13.4%
|-
 
|Liberal
|Bernie Phillips
|align="right"| 211
|align="right"| 27.5%
|align="right"| +3.4%
|-

|-
! align=left colspan=3|Total
! align=right| 766
! align=right| 100.0%
! align=right| –
|}

2002 general election

|-
 
|NDP
|Todd Hardy
|align="right"| 300
|align="right"| 33.2%
|align="right"| -0.7%
|-
 
|Liberal
|Bernie Phillips
|align="right"| 218
|align="right"| 24.1%
|align="right"| -22.1%
|-

|Independent
|Mike McLarnon
|align="right"| 207
|align="right"| 22.9%
|align="right"| –
|-

|-
! align=left colspan=3|Total
! align=right| 904
! align=right| 100.0%
! align=right| –
|}

2000 general election

|-
 
|Liberal
|Mike McLarnon
|align="right"| 312
|align="right"| 46.2%
|align="right"| +23.0%
|-
 
|NDP
|Todd Hardy
|align="right"| 229
|align="right"| 33.9%
|align="right"| -11.9%
|-

|-
! align=left colspan=3|Total
! align=right| 676
! align=right| 100.0%
! align=right| –
|}

1996 general election

|-
 
|NDP
|Todd Hardy
|align="right"| 328
|align="right"| 45.8%
|align="right"| +8.3%
|-

|-
 
|Liberal
|Jon Breen
|align="right"| 166
|align="right"| 23.2%
|align="right"| -1.7%
|-
! align=left colspan=3|Total
! align=right| 716
! align=right| 100.0%
! align=right| –
|}

1992 general election

|-

| NDP
| Margaret Commodore
| align="right"| 288
| align="right"| 37.5%
| align="right"| –
|-

|-

| Liberal
| Phil Wheelton
| align="right"| 191
| align="right"| 24.9%
| align="right"| –
|-
! align=left colspan=3|Total
! align=right| 768
! align=right| 100.0%
! align=right| –
|}

References

Yukon territorial electoral districts
Politics of Whitehorse